Chungju Mae clan is one of the Korean clans. Their Bon-gwan is in Chungju, North Chungcheong Province. According to the research held in 2000, the number of the Chungju Mae clan was 210. He was from Jinan, Shandong, China. He was naturalized and settled in Chungju after he immigrated to Korea. According to the census held in 1985 and 2000, the number of the Chungju Mae clan was 200. Also, Haeju Mae clan and Chungju Mae clan have the same origin, but the population was only one family with four people.

See also 
 Korean clan names of foreign origin

References

External links 
 

 
Korean clan names of Chinese origin